Park Tae-sang (Hangul: 박태상; born June 20, 1979) is a retired South Korean professional badminton player. After retiring as a badminton player, he decided to become a coach, starting his career with South Korea national team.

Career

2004
Park played badminton at the 2004 Summer Olympics in men's singles, defeating Abhinn Shyam Gupta of India and Bao Chunlai of China in the first two rounds. In the quarterfinals, Park was defeated by Soni Dwi Kuncoro of Indonesia 15-13, 15-4.

Coaching career
Park started his career as a badminton coach at the South Korea national team, and served his country for five years, from 2013 to 2018. Park joined the India national team in 2019 and began coaching the men's singles players. He is currently the coach of Indian player P. V. Sindhu and helped her to win an Olympic bronze medal in 2020 Tokyo Olympic Games, and then the gold medal in 2022 Birmingham Commonwealth Games.

Achievements

Asian Championships 
Men's singles

IBF World Grand Prix 
The World Badminton Grand Prix sanctioned by International Badminton Federation (IBF) since 1983.

Men's singles

BWF Grand Prix 
The BWF Grand Prix had two levels, the BWF Grand Prix and Grand Prix Gold. It was a series of badminton tournaments sanctioned by the Badminton World Federation (BWF) which was held from 2007 to 2017.

Men's doubles

  BWF Grand Prix Gold tournament
  BWF Grand Prix tournament

IBF International 
Men's singles

References

External links

1979 births
Living people
Sportspeople from Busan
South Korean male badminton players
Badminton players at the 2004 Summer Olympics
Olympic badminton players of South Korea
Badminton players at the 2002 Asian Games
Asian Games gold medalists for South Korea
Asian Games medalists in badminton
Medalists at the 2002 Asian Games
Badminton coaches
South Korean expatriate sportspeople in India